Joseph Lucien Paul Maynard (February 17, 1908 – February 7, 1996) was a lawyer and a provincial politician from Alberta, Canada. He served in the Legislative Assembly of Alberta from 1935 to 1955 as a member of the Social Credit Party.

Maynard served as a cabinet minister under Premiers William Aberhart and Ernest Manning in various portfolios from 1936 to 1955.

Political career
Maynard first ran for a seat in the Alberta Legislature in the 1935 general election. He contested the Beaver River electoral district under the Social Credit banner and defeated three other candidates, including incumbent Henry Dakin and former MLA John Delisle. Premier William Aberhart appointed him to the Executive Council of Alberta as a Minister without portfolio on May 12, 1936. Less than a year later, on January 20, 1937, Aberhart promoted Maynard to Minister of Municipal Affairs.

On June 1, 1943, Ernest Manning, who had recently succeeded Aberhart as premier, promoted Maynard to Attorney General. He remained in that portfolio until his defeat in his home riding of St. Albert in the 1955 general election at the hands of Liberal candidate Arthur Soetaert. Maynard's defeat left the Social Credit government without any lawyers in caucus; Premier Ernest Manning then took the post of Attorney General himself.

In 1962 Maynard attempted a return to politics by running in the electoral district of Edmonton East for the federal Social Credit party in that year's federal election. He finished a distant second to Progressive Conservative incumbent William Skoreyko. Maynard ran against Skoreyko again in the 1963 election, but fared even more poorly, finishing a distant third.

Many years later, in 1985, Maynard ran as an independent in a provincial by-election in the Edmonton-Whitemud electoral district. He finished in fifth place out of six candidates, losing to Premier Don Getty.

He made one last bid for office in the 1988 federal election as a candidate of the Confederation of Regions Party in Edmonton Northwest. He finished sixth out of seven candidates, losing to incumbent Murray Dorin.

References

External links
Legislative Assembly of Alberta Members Listing

1908 births
1996 deaths
Alberta Social Credit Party MLAs
Candidates in the 1962 Canadian federal election
Candidates in the 1963 Canadian federal election
Confederation of Regions Party of Canada candidates in the 1988 Canadian federal election
Members of the Executive Council of Alberta
Politicians from Montreal